Coray Colina is a Professor of Chemistry at the University of Florida.

Education 
Colina received her BS in 1993 and MS in 1994 at Simón Bolívar University in Venezuela. She earned her PhD at North Carolina State University in 2004 advised by Keith E. Gubbins, and subsequently worked as a Postdoctoral researcher at the University of North Carolina at Chapel Hill.

Career 
Colina was a faculty member Simón Bolívar University, joined Pennsylvania State University in 2007, and moved to University of Florida in 2015.

Colina acted as the chair of the Computational Molecular Science & Engineering Forum (CoMSEF) of the American Institute of Chemical Engineers (AIChE) in 2014–2016, after having been a CoMSEF liaison director in 2009–2011. Colina was elected to the board of directors of the Materials Research Society (MRS) in 2019.

Colina is also on the editorial advisory board of ACS Macro Letters, as well as Macromolecules.

Awards and honors 
Colina's honors include:
 1999 Award for Outstanding Teaching Achievement (Simón Bolívar University)
 2019 Cooperative Research Award in Applied Polymer Science

Selected works 
 Frank T. Willmore, Eric Jankowski, Coray Colina, "Introduction to Scientific and Technical Computing", CRC Press, 2016
 Silvia Siquier, Coray Colina, "Aprendiendo termodinámica", Editorial Equinoccio, Colección Paraninfo, 2017 
 Coray M. Colina, et al., "Python Simulation Interface for Molecular Modeling" 
 Coray Colina, et al., "Force Field Database"

References

External links
 
 
 

University of Florida faculty
North Carolina State University alumni
Simón Bolívar University (Venezuela) alumni
Living people
Year of birth missing (living people)